Johnstone Football Club was a  football club based at Newfield Park in Johnstone, Renfrewshire in Scotland. The club was a member of the Scottish Football League in two spells between 1912 and 1926.

History
The club was formed in 1878 and initially played at Cartland Bank. After spending time in minor leagues, they joined the Scottish Football Alliance in 1894 after most of its membership had moved to the new Scottish League Division Two. In the same year the club moved to Newfield Park. During this time the club demonstrated its potential in the Scottish Cup by beating Greenock Abstainers 20–0 in a first round tie on 5 September 1891. In subsequent seasons they would play in the North Ayrshire League and, from 1898 until 1905, the Scottish Football Combination.

Johnstone then joined the Scottish Football Union and from this league, one of the strongest leagues outside the Scottish League at the time, the club were admitted to the Scottish Football League when Division Two was expanded for the 1912–13 season. When the league was reduced to a single division in 1915, due to World War I, Johnstone played in the Western League. Johnstone returned to the Scottish League when the second division was reinstated in 1921. Johnstone were relegated to the new Third Division at the end of the 1924–25 season. When this division was disbanded at the end of the following season, Johnstone returned to the Football Alliance. They remained in this league until 1927 when they were wound up.

Colours
1877?–1880? Navy blue shirts, navy blue shorts, navy blue & white hooped socks.
1880–1896 Navy blue shirts, white shorts, navy blue socks.
1896–1902 Royal blue shirts, white shorts, royal blue socks.
1902–1903 Maroon shirts, white shorts, maroon socks.
1903–1904 Royal blue shirts, white shorts, royal blue socks.
1907–1909 Black & white striped shirts, white shorts, black socks.
1909–1920 Black & gold striped shirts, white shorts, black socks with 2 gold bands on top.
1921–1923 Black & gold striped shirts, black shorts, black socks with 2 gold bands on top.
1923–1927 White shirts with black collar & cuffs, white shorts, black socks with 2 white bands on top.

References

External links
Johnstone Historical Kits

 
Defunct football clubs in Scotland
Association football clubs established in 1878
Association football clubs disestablished in 1927
Football in Renfrewshire
Scottish Football League teams
1878 establishments in Scotland
1927 disestablishments in Scotland